Ramazan Öztürk (born 19 March 1992) is a Turkish badminton player.

Achievements

BWF International Challenge/Series 
Men's singles

Men's doubles

Mixed doubles

  BWF International Challenge tournament
  BWF International Series tournament
  BWF Future Series tournament

References

External links 
 

1992 births
Living people
Turkish male badminton players
Competitors at the 2013 Mediterranean Games
Mediterranean Games competitors for Turkey